John Rooney (born 20 October 1979) is an Irish professional squash player, and a former Irish number 1. He is currently unranked by the World Squash Federation but his highest world ranking was 52. He occasionally takes part in showcase matches and squash schools.
Rooney lost in the finals of the 2008 Irish National Squash Championships to Liam Kenny.

Rooney won the Irish National Championship in back to back years and was named as an assistant squash coach at Yale University in August 2011. After leaving Yale, he coached at the Tennis and Squash Club in Buffalo, NY and is now the Head Squash Professional at the University Club of Chicago in Chicago, IL. He is now coaching top ranked juniors at the University Club of Chicago, such as Zaid Khan, Gaurav Shekhawat, and Peter Grissom who are climbing up the junior rankings.

References

External links 
 

Irish male squash players
Living people
1979 births